Music for 'Fragments from the Inside' is an album consisting of music composed and performed by Eraldo Bernocchi and Harold Budd for a video installation by videographer Petulia Mattioli and poet Mara Bressi.  Part of the exhibition "Palazzo Delle Liberta" at the Palazzo Delle Papesse Centro Arte Contemporanea (Siena, Italy), the installation combined visual elements with Bernocchi and Budd's compositions. Recorded live in the Palazzo's courtyard on June 26, 2003, the album was first released on CD (Sub Rosa SR239) in 2005 with later reissues available in different formats.

Track listing 
 "Fragment One" – 8:11
 "Fragment Two" – 8:32
 "Fragment Three" – 9:40
 "Fragment Four" – 8:56
 "Fragment Five" – 8:28
 "Fragment Six" – 11:08
 "Fragment Seven" – 20:16

Credits 
 Performer: Eraldo Bernocchi, Harold Budd, Mara Bressi (poetry)
 Composer: Eraldo Bernocchi, Harold Budd (tracks 2 to 7), Harold Budd (track 1)
 Design, Artwork: Petulia Mattioli
 Mastering: Michael Fossenkemper
 Mixing: Eraldo Bernocchi, Gianpolo Antoni
 Engineer: Francesco Oliveto
 Producer: Eraldo Bernocchi

References 

 Track titles, times, and information about the art exhibit were taken from the ArtistDirect.com product page.

Harold Budd albums
2005 albums
Ambient albums by American artists
Ambient albums by Italian artists